Beccadelli is a surname. Notable people with the surname include:

Antonio Beccadelli (disambiguation), multiple people
Maria Beccadelli